Michael Idovolo Madoya  (born 2 Feb 1989) is a midfielder with Kenyan Premier League side Nairobi City Stars.

Career
Madoya started his Kenyan Premier League journey at Kericho-based Zoo FC where he was named the league's Most Valuable Player at the end of the 2017 Kenyan Premier League season. 

He then moved to Tusker F.C. on a three-year-deal from 2018 with whom he won the 2020-21 title in his final season. 

After his contract lapsed, he moved to Nairobi City Stars for the 2020-21 Kenyan Premier League season. He was handed his City Stars debut by head coach Nicholas Muyoti on 24 Oct 2021 in Thika Stadium after coming on as a second-half substitute in a matchday six tie against Bidco United.

Honours

Club
Tusker F.C.
Kenyan Premier League
 Champion (1): 2020/21

Individual
National Super League
 Top scorer (1): 2016 (Zoo FC)
Kenyan Premier League
 Player of the Month (1): June/July 2017 (Zoo FC)
 Fair Play player of the Year (2): 2017, 2018 (Zoo FC)
 Midfielder of the Year (1): 2017 (Zoo FC)
 New Player of the Year (1): 2017 (Zoo FC)
 Player of the Year (1): 2017 (Zoo FC)
 Midfielder of the Year - 2nd runnersup (1): 2018 (Zoo FC)

References

External links
 

1989 births
Living people
Kenyan footballers
Kenyan Premier League players
Tusker F.C. players
Nairobi City Stars players
Association football midfielders